Daviesia cordata, commonly known as bookleaf, is a species of flowering plant in the family Fabaceae and is endemic to the south-west of Western Australia. It is a slender, erect shrub with scattered egg-shaped phyllodes, and yellow-orange and pinkish-purple flowers.

Description

Taxonomy
Davieia cordata was first formally described in 1808 by James Edward Smith in The Cyclopaedia based on specimens collected from King George Sound. The specific epithet (cordata) mean "heart-shaped".

Distribution and habitat
Bookleaf grows in open forest and mallee-heath and is common from near Perth to Albany in the Avon Wheatbelt, Jarrah Forest, Swan Coastal Plain and Warren biogeographic regions of south-western Western Australia.

References

cordata
Rosids of Western Australia
Plants described in 1808
Taxa named by James Edward Smith